Attheya longicornis is a species of diatoms in the genus Attheya. Type material was collected from Penberth, Cornwall in England.

References

External links
INA card for Attheya longicornis

Protists described in 1994
Ochrophyte species
Coscinodiscophyceae